Klapperichimorda lutevittata is a species of beetle in the genus Klapperichimorda of the family Mordellidae, which is part of the superfamily Tenebrionoidea. It was discovered in 1995.

References

Beetles described in 1995
Mordellidae